Timm Stade (born 31 March 1968) is a German former windsurfer. He competed in the men's Lechner A-390 event at the 1992 Summer Olympics.

References

External links
 

1968 births
Living people
German male sailors (sport)
German windsurfers
Olympic sailors of Germany
Sailors at the 1992 Summer Olympics – Lechner A-390
People from Lindau
Sportspeople from Swabia (Bavaria)